Asceles opacus, is a species of phasmid or stick insect of the genus Asceles. It is found in Sri Lanka.

References

External links
World of Phasmids - A-5
Designation of type-species of several genera of Phasmatodea: Areolatae

Lonchodidae
Insects of Asia
Insects described in 1908